Isotrichothrips is a genus of thrips in the family Phlaeothripidae.

Species
 Isotrichothrips consanguineus
 Isotrichothrips longirostris

References

Phlaeothripidae
Thrips
Thrips genera